Shaanxi Warriors Beyond Football Club is a professional Chinese football club that currently participates in the China League Two. The team is based in Xi'an, Shaanxi.

History
Xi'an UKD was founded in 2019. In March 2021, Xi'an UKD changed its name to Shaanxi Warriors Beyond.

Current squad

First team

Reserve squad

Coaching staff

Results

References

Football clubs in China
Association football clubs established in 2019
Sport in Xi'an
2019 establishments in China